Empheriidae is an extinct family of Psocoptera in the suborder Trogiomorpha.

Genera 

 †Burmempheria Li et al. 2020 Burmese amber, Myanmar, Cenomanian
 †Empheria Hagen 1856 Baltic amber, Eocene
 †Empheropsocus Baz and Ortuño 2001 Spanish amber, Albian
 †Eoempheria Nel et al. 2005 Oise amber, France, Ypresian
 †Jerseyempheria Azar et al. 2010 New Jersey amber, Turonian
 †Preempheria Baz and Ortuño 2001 Spanish amber, Albian
 †Trichempheria Enderlein 1911 Baltic amber, Rovno amber, Eocene

References 

Trogiomorpha
Prehistoric insect families